Fürstenau (Northern Low Saxon: Försnau) is a municipality in the district of Osnabrück, in Lower Saxony, Germany.

Fürstenau is also the seat of the Samtgemeinde ("collective municipality") Fürstenau.

St. Georg Evangelical Lutheran Church stands in the city market square.  Pastor Anke Kusche tells the story of how during World War II the army required all the available metal for war products.  The church bells which had rung daily for hundreds of years were taken down as required. But during the night one of them was stolen and buried until after the war in a farmer's field.

In the city clerks office hangs a painting of the city in the late 18th century. It is how the city still looks in December 2006.

Notable people

Born in Fürstenau 
 Franz Berding (1915-2010), politician (CDU)
 Ida Raming (born 1932), Catholic theologian and author
 Reinhard von Schorlemer (born 1938), politician, member for the Bundestag, forester and farmer

Connected to the city 

 Eric of Brunswick-Grubenhagen (1478-1532) was from 1508 to 1532 principal bishop of Paderborn and Osnabrück and in 1532 elected bishop of Münster 
 Henry of Saxe-Lauenburg (1550-1585), archbishop of Bremen (Henry III), Prince Bishop of Osnabrück 
 Philip Sigismund of Brunswick-Wolfenbüttel (1568-1623) Prince-Bishop of Osnabrück and Verden.
 Hans Christoff von Königsmarck (1600-1663), German army leader in Swedish services 
 Dirk Hafemeister (born 1958), equestrian and Olympic champion
 Luciana Diniz (born 1970) equestrian, show jumping

References

Osnabrück (district)
Members of the Hanseatic League